Rolf Majcen (born 1966) is a Lower Austrian economist-lawyer, writer and extreme sports athlete.

Biography 
Majcen was born in Johannesburg. He is the grandnephew of Karl Majcen, the former General-Inspector of the Austrian Bundesheer. He earned a doctoral degree in law and served as an officer in the Bundesheer from 1985 to 1998. While serving in the Bundesheer he completed air rescuer and army mountain guide assistant training.

Majcen published several juridical economy and sports contributions in Europe, America and Asia. His first book Sieg in den Bergen (victory in the mountains), published in 2002, was awarded by the Union Internationale des Associations d'Alpinisme (UIAA). He also took part in several sports competitions. He was the first Austrian, who competed in all the three classical ski mountaineering events, the Patrouille des Glaciers (2000 and 2004), the Pierra Menta (2001) and the Trofeo Mezzalama (2003). In 2004, Majcen and Hermann Kofler were the first Austrian athletes who gained World Cup points in ski mountaineering for their country.

Selected results

Ski mountaineering 
 2002:
 7th, International Vlado-Tatarka memory race, Hrebienok (together with Franz Hausmann)
 2004:
 1st, Lower Austrian Championship
 6th, International Turnosmučarski-Rallye, Triglav National Park (together with Franz Hausmann)
 7th and Austrian record, Patrouille des Glaciers "seniors II" class ranking (together with Hermann Kofler and Johann Wieland)
 2005:
 1st, Lower Austrian Championship
 2007:
 1st, Lower Austrian Championship

Stair running 
 1st, Judenburg-tower race
 1999:
 1st, Royal Mutual Funds CN Tower Stair Climb, Toronto
 2000:
 8th, Empire State Building Run Up
 2001:
 1st, Magdeburger Uni-Hochhaus race, Magdeburg
 9th, Empire State Building Run Up
 14th, Ostankino Tower race
 2002:
 2nd, Original Schlossberg race
 3rd, Donauturm race
 2007:
 5th, Donauturm race
 2008:
 3rd, Frankfurt Messeturm race
 6th, Donauturm race
 7th, "Go Vertical Chicago", Sears Tower
 7th, "Hustle up the Hankock", John Hancock Center
 12th, Taipei 101 race

References

External links 

 
 Official Website 
 Interview mit Rolf Majcen (11/2003), Skibergsteiger , Mountain2b-Redaktion, November 5, 2003

1966 births
Living people
Austrian male ski mountaineers
Austrian jurists
Austrian soldiers
Austrian male writers
Sportspeople from Johannesburg
Austrian male long-distance runners
Tower runners